Evelyn Valdez-Ward is a scientist and immigration activist living in the US. She is known for her activism related to DACA as a formerly undocumented scientist.

Education 

Valdez-Ward is a PhD Candidate in ecology at the University of California, Irvine. Her research is focused on the impact of California's drought on the communication and interaction of the plants and their soil microbes.

Scientific career 

Valdez-Ward is a founder of Reclaiming STEM, a science communication workshop series aimed at underrepresented minorities in STEM. The goal of the workshops is to help scientists learn to use STEM for social justice. This workshop series was partially funded by a grant from the American Geophysical Union.

Valdez-Ward was also a speaker at the 2018 March for Science in Washington, D.C.

Immigration Activism 

Valdez-Ward advocates for DACA and improved rights for undocumented people in the US, especially scientists. She is a DACA recipient and was born in Mexico City. She learned that she was undocumented while applying for college. As a graduate student at the University of California, she was one of 10 UC students and alumni who were featured in a documentary about being undocumented, which was part of a federal lawsuit to maintain DACA. She argues that DACA and immigration are science issues. In January 2020, Valdez-Ward became a legal permanent resident.

In 2018, she was named a Science Defender by the Union of Concerned Scientists because of her activism.

Honors and awards 

 Dynamic Womxn's Award for Outstanding Social Justice Activist, UC Irvine, 2018
 Science Defender, Union of Concerned Scientists, 2018
 Annual List Of 50 Fixers, 2020 Grist 50 
 Ford Foundation Dissertation Fellowship, 2017

References 

Immigrant rights activists
Scientists from Mexico City
American Geophysical Union
American ecologists
Women ecologists
Living people
Year of birth missing (living people)
American women scientists
21st-century American women